E Street Radio is a Sirius XM Radio channel broadcasting on Sirius 20 as well as on Dish Network channel 6020. Its format concentrates on Bruce Springsteen and the E Street Band, including interviews, guest disc jockey sessions, studio outtakes, concert recordings, rarities and more.

This was originally a Sirius-only channel, starting on November 1, 2005, to coincide with the release of Born to Run 30th Anniversary Edition.  That run finished three months later on January 31, 2006.

Sirius restarted E Street Radio on Channel 10 on September 27, 2007 in anticipation of his album Magic and the Magic Tour. 
It was programmed by Thomas Wilkinson

Celebrities that are Springsteen fans often appear on the channel. Brian Williams, Tom Morello, Pete Yorn, Dr. Oz, and even E Street Band member Max Weinberg's son Jay Weinberg have appeared on the channel.

E Street Radio celebrated ten years of satellite radio on March 9, 2012 with an exclusive live performance at the Apollo Theatre from Springsteen and the E Street Band to kick off the Wrecking Ball Tour.

References

Sirius Satellite Radio channels
XM Satellite Radio channels
Sirius XM Radio channels
Radio stations established in 2005
Bruce Springsteen